Cycle 3 of Canada's Next Top Model, the Canadian adaptation of Tyra Banks' America's Next Top Model, aired on CTV from May to July 2009. Jay Manuel returned for his second season as the show's host. The panel was composed of Jeanne Beker, Yasmin Warsame, and photographer Mike Ruiz, who was the only new addition. Nolé Marin returned as creative director for the show. Encore presentations of the show aired on A-Channel, Star! and FashionTelevisionChannel. The cycle's catchphrase was "It's time to break the mould."

The prize package for this cycle included a modeling contract with Elmer Olsen Model Management, an editorial spread in Fashion magazine, and a beauty contract valued at $100,000 from Procter & Gamble.

The winner of the competition was 19-year-old Meaghan Waller from Winnipeg, Manitoba and is the most successful contestant from Canada's Next Top Model.

Cast

Contestants
(Ages stated are at start of contest)

Judges
 Jay Manuel (host)
 Jeanne Beker
 Mike Ruiz
 Yasmin Warsame

Other cast members
 Nolé Marin - creative director

Episodes

Results

 The contestant quit the competition 
 The contestant was eliminated
 The contestant won the competition

Average call-out order
Final two are not included.

Bottom two

 The contestant was eliminated after her first time in the bottom two
 The contestant was eliminated after her second time in the bottom two
 The contestant was eliminated after her third time in the bottom two
 The contestant was eliminated in the final judging and placed as the runner-up

Photo shoot guide
Episode 1 photo shoot: 80's glamour with wild animals
Episode 2 photo shoot: Posing on a ladder with male models
Episode 3 photo shoot: Castaway brides in Bahamas beach
Episode 4 photo shoot: Avantgarde beauty shots with duct tape on lips 
Episode 5 photo shoot: LG phone ad in a club
Episode 6 photo shoot: Couture and geeky crew member alter egos
Episode 7 photo shoot: CoverGirl Exact Eye Lights
Episode 8 photo shoot: Fashion magazine covers

Makeovers
Jill - Deborah Harry inspired shoulder length cut and dyed ice blonde
Ebonie - Halle Berry inspired cut and dyed brown intended; later, short black weave
Tara - Trimmed with side bang
Rebeccah - Agyness Deyn inspired pixie cut and dyed platinum blonde
Heather - Dyed strawberry blonde and eyebrows bleached
Maryam - Vidal Sassoon inspired shoulder-length bob
Nikita - Bettie Paige inspired shoulder length cut with short bangs and dyed black
Linsay - Linda Evangelista inspired cut and dyed black
Meaghan - Long blonde extensions with bangs

Notes

References

Canada's Next Top Model
2009 Canadian television seasons
Television shows filmed in Toronto
Television shows filmed in the Bahamas
Television shows filmed in New York City

zh:加拿大超級名模生死鬥第三季